Noh Sang-hyun (born July 19, 1990) or Steve Sanghyun Noh is a Korean-American actor and model.

Early life and education 
Noh spent his childhood in Boston, USA, and graduated from the School of Business Administration at Babson College.

Filmography

Film

Television series

Web series

Television shows

Awards and nominations

References

External links 
 
 

1990 births
Living people
South Korean male television actors
South Korean male film actors
South Korean male web series actors
South Korean emigrants to the United States
Babson College alumni
People from Boston